The 1973 CCHA Men's Ice Hockey Tournament was the second CCHA Men's Ice Hockey Tournament. It was played between March 2 and March 4, 1973, at St. Louis Arena in St. Louis, Missouri. Bowling Green won the tournament, finishing the round robin with a 2–0 record.

Conference standings
Note: GP = Games played; W = Wins; L = Losses; T = Ties; PTS = Points; GF = Goals For; GA = Goals Against

Round robin

Results

(1) Saint Louis vs. (4) Bowling Green

(1) Saint Louis vs. (3) Ohio State

(3) Ohio State vs. (4) Bowling Green

Tournament awards

All-Tournament Team
F Bruce Woodhouse (Bowling Green)
F John Stewart (Bowling Green)
F Rick Kennedy (Saint Louis)
D Jan Kascak (Saint Louis)
D Roger Archer (Bowling Green)
G Ralph Kloiber (Saint Louis)

References

External links
Central Collegiate Hockey Association

CCHA Men's Ice Hockey Tournament
Ccha tournament